was a Japanese comedian. He was one of the members of The Drifters.

Nakamoto graduated from Gakushuin University. He occasionally appeared in the dramas and films as an actor.

He died in a traffic collision on October 19, 2022, at the age of 81.

Works

Variety show
 Hachiji Dayo, Zen'inshugo! ('It's eight o'clock PM, everyone togather!', 1969-85)
 Dorifu Daibakusho (1976-2003)
 Tobe Son Goku (1977-78)

Television drama
 Tōyama no Kin-san (1985-86) as Hirame Ginjirō
 Sōrito Yobanaide (1997) as Deputy Secretary-General of the Cabinet Secretariat
 Scrap Teacher (2008) as John Sakita

Film
 Yawara! (1989) as Kamoda
 Asako I & II (2018) as Hirakawa

References

External links
Kōji Nakamoto at Izawa Office
Kōji Nakamoto at official Youtube

1941 births
2022 deaths
Japanese male comedians
Japanese male actors
20th-century Japanese guitarists
21st-century Japanese guitarists
Comedians from Tokyo
Musicians from Tokyo
Gakushuin University alumni
Road incident deaths in Japan